Margaux-Cantenac is a commune in the department of Gironde, southwestern France. The municipality was established on 1 January 2017 by merger of the former communes of Margaux (the seat) and Cantenac.

Population

See also 
Communes of the Gironde department

References 

Communes of Gironde